James J. Kennedy (born February 9, 1953) is a Democratic Party politician who has represented the 22nd Legislative District in the New Jersey General Assembly since taking office in January 2016. He served as Mayor of Rahway, New Jersey from 1991 through 2010, when he declined to seek a sixth term.

Career 
Kennedy won his first nomination in the 1990 Democratic primary election, when he contested the re-election for Daniel Martin, who at the time had been mayor for 20 years. Kennedy owns a local store, Kennedy Jewelers, that was adversely affected by the decline of the city's downtown area during the 1970s and 1980s, and he was president of the Rahway Chamber of Commerce during the later 1980s. While serving on the board of trustees for the Rahway YMCA, Kennedy befriended Jim McGreevey, a lawyer then residing in neighboring Woodbridge Township who would ultimately become Governor of New Jersey. After McGreevey became governor, Kennedy joined State Street Partners, a Trenton lobbying firm founded by Rocco F. Iossa, a former aide to Republican Congressman Dennis Gallo and counselor to GOP Governor Christine Todd Whitman. After McGreevey, resigned Kennedy started a business, Skye Consulting L.L.C., which has assisted local governments, redevelopment contractors and a foreign-owned water treatment and waste management utility company.

Kennedy and his wife, Lori, a kindergarten teacher who retired in June 2011, have one son, Sean, who operates the jewelry store on a day-to-day basis. The couple previously had another child, who died when he was two years old.

New Jersey Assembly 
Following the retirement of incumbent Democratic Assemblywoman Linda Stender in 2015, Kennedy was chosen by the local Democratic County Committees over Fanwood Mayor Colleen Mahr to succeed Stender. He won the general election alongside incumbent Jerry Green that November.

Committees 
For the 2020–2021 Legislative Session, Kennedy served on the following committees:
Environment and Solid Waste (as Chair)
Tourism, Gaming and the Arts (as Vice Chair)
Transportation and Independent Authorities

District 22 
Each of the 40 districts in the New Jersey Legislature has one representative in the New Jersey Senate and two members in the New Jersey General Assembly. The representatives from the 22nd District for the 2022—23 Legislative Session are:
Senator Nicholas Scutari (D) 
Assemblywoman Linda S. Carter (D) 
Assemblyman James J. Kennedy (D)

Electoral history

New Jersey Assembly

References

External links
Legislative web page

1953 births
Living people
People from Rahway, New Jersey
Politicians from Union County, New Jersey
Mayors of places in New Jersey
Democratic Party members of the New Jersey General Assembly
21st-century American politicians